The Cat Creek Oil Field Sign, located about  west of the town of Mosby at about mile 150 on Highway 200, in Petroleum County, Montana, was listed on the National Register of Historic Places in 2015.

It is "an isolated and lonely reminder of the once booming oil industry presence in central Montana during the infancy of commercial oil development" in Montana.  It commemorates the Cat Creek Oil Field which boomed during 1920-1925 and again in the 1940s.

References

National Register of Historic Places in Petroleum County, Montana
Individual signs on the National Register of Historic Places